Senator Arzberger may refer to:

Gus Arzberger (1921–2016), Arizona State Senate
Marsha Arzberger (born 1937), Arizona State Senate